The FBA 16 HE2, (HE2 - Hydravion d'entrainement 2 sieges - flying boat trainer 2-seat), was a flying boat trainer built in France in the early 1920s.

Development
The FBA 16 HE2 was a two-seat biplane flying boat of all-wood construction.

Specifications

References

1920s French aircraft
FBA aircraft
Flying boats
Biplanes
Aircraft first flown in 1923